Uruguayans  are people identified with the country of Uruguay, through citizenship or descent. Uruguay is home to people of different ethnic origins. As a result, many Uruguayans do not equate their nationality with ethnicity, but with citizenship and their allegiance to Uruguay. Colloquially, primarily among other Spanish-speaking Latin American nations, Uruguayans are also referred to as "orientals [as in Easterners]".

Uruguay is, along with much of the Americas, a melting pot of different peoples, with the difference that it has traditionally maintained a model that promotes cultural assimilation, hence the different cultures have been absorbed by the mainstream. Uruguay has one of the most homogeneous populations in South America; the most common ethnic backgrounds by far being those from Spain, Italy, Germany and France i.e. Spanish Uruguayans, Italian Uruguayans, German Uruguayans , French Uruguayans and Polish Uruguayans.

Immigration waves

Uruguayans share a Spanish linguistic and cultural background with Argentines. Also, like Argentines, most Uruguayans descend from colonial-era settlers and immigrants from Europe with almost 88% of the population being of European descent.

The majority of these are Spaniards and Italians, followed by the French, Portuguese, Germans, Romanians, Greeks, British (English or Scots), Irish, Poles, Swiss, Russians, Bulgarians, Arab (mainly Lebanese and Syrians), Sephardi and Ashkenazi Jews and Armenians.

There are also smaller numbers of Japanese, as well as Amerindians, mainly Charrúa, Minuán, Chaná, Güenoa and Guaraní. Montevideo, like Buenos Aires in Argentina and Santos in Brazil, was a major seaport to dock ships coming from Europe and elsewhere and European settlement greatly affected Uruguay to have a more western oriented culture.

Many colonies such as Nueva Helvecia-Colonia Suiza, a Swiss colony and Colonia Valdense, a Piedmontese waldensian colony, are located in the department of Colonia. Also, there are towns founded by British settlers, like Conchillas and Barker. Two Russian colonies called San Javier and Colonia Ofir, are found in the department of Río Negro. Also there are Mennonite colonies in the department of Río Negro like Gartental and El Ombú, in Canelones Department called Colonia Nicolich, and in San José Department called Colonia Delta. El Ombú, is famous for its well-known Dulce de Leche "Claldy" and is located near the city of Young.

Many of the European immigrants arrived in Uruguay in the late 19th century and have heavily influenced the architecture and culture of Montevideo and other major cities. For this reason, Montevideo and life within the city are very reminiscent of Europe.

Racial and ethnic groups

The majority of Uruguayans or their ancestors immigrated within the past five centuries, with the exception of the Native American population.

Europeans or whites

People of European ancestry comprise 87.7% of Uruguay's population according to the 2011 official census and chose "white" as their principal or main ancestry. Early Uruguayans are descendants of colonists from Spain and Portugal during the colonial period prior to 1810.  Similar to the demographics of Argentina, more recent immigrants from Europe, largely from Italy, Germany and France, arrived in the great migratory wave during the late 19th century and early 20th century. Today, Uruguay's culture is influenced heavily by its European roots which is evident in its language, food and other aspects of everyday life.

Mestizos & Amerindians

Up to 2.4% of the population are of Mestizo (European-Amerindian) ancestry according to the 2011 census. People with Amerindian ancestry can be found in the north of Uruguay, primarily in Tacuarembó Department, where the Amerindian ancestry accounts for 20% of the population.

A 1996 census identified that 12,600 people in Uruguay were Amerindian descendants. In 2006, a census confirmed that there were 115,118 Uruguayans that descended from one Amerindian ethnic group, the Charrúas, reaching up to 4% of the country's population. In 2005, Sinthia Pagano, M.D conducted a genetic study, detecting that 38% of Uruguayans may have expressed partial genetic influence from the Amerindian population.

Africans

Africans, Blacks and Mulattos in Uruguay are more or less 209,662 and they are mostly found in Montevideo, Rivera Department, Artigas Department, Salto Department and Cerro Largo Department. A 2011 census marked that there are more than 300,000 African descendants and that 80% of Afro-Uruguayans are under the working class line.

Languages

Although Spanish is dominant, being the national language spoken by virtually all Uruguayans, Italian and French are also relevant. Portuguese is spoken in the Uruguayan-Brazilian frontier, Fronterizo/Fronteiriço is the specific name for Uruguayan Portuguese. The audiovisual standard language is the Uruguayan Spanish, a variety of Rioplatense Spanish. Lunfardo is also spoken in Uruguay.

Culture
Contemporary Uruguayan culture comes from the contribution of its alternating early settlers from Spain and Portugal, and important influence of European immigrants – Italians, French, Portuguese, Romanians, and Greeks, among others- and traditions blended with Amerindian and African elements. Uruguay has Portuguese and Spanish colonial architectural heritage and many writers, artists, and musicians. Candombe is the most important example of African influence by slaves. Charrua and Guaraní traditions can be seen in mate, the national drink. Both Uruguay and Argentina share its traditional gaúcho roots (which originated in Andalusia).

Religion

Uruguay has no official religion; church and state are officially separated, and religious freedom is guaranteed. A 2008 survey by the INE of Uruguay showed Catholicism as the main religion, with 45.7% of the population; 9.0% are non-Catholic Christians, 0.6% are Animists or Umbandists (an Afro-Brazilian religion), and 0.4% Jewish. 30.1% reported believing in a god, but not belonging to any religion, while 14% were atheist or agnostic.

Political observers consider Uruguay the most secular country in the Americas. Uruguay's secularization began with the relatively minor role of the church in the colonial era, compared with other parts of the Spanish Empire. The small numbers of Uruguay's indigenous peoples and their fierce resistance to proselytism reduced the influence of the ecclesiastical authorities.

In 1837 civil marriage was recognized, and in 1861 the state took over the running of public cemeteries. In 1907 divorce was legalized and, in 1909 all religious instruction was banned from state schools. Under the influence of the innovative Colorado reformer José Batlle y Ordóñez (1903–1911), complete separation of church and state was introduced with the new constitution of 1917.

Uruguay's capital has 12 synagogues, and a community of 20,000 Jews by 2011. With a peak of 50,000 during the mid-1960s, Uruguay has the world's highest rate of aliyah as a percentage of the Jewish population.

The Baháʼí Faith is also practiced, along with Afro-Brazilian religions such as Quimbanda, Candomblé, and Umbanda.

Music

Music of Uruguay includes a number of local musical forms. The most distinctive ones are tango, murga, a form of musical theater, and candombe, an Afro-Uruguayan type of music which occur yearly during the Carnival period. There is also milonga, a folk guitar and song form deriving from Spanish traditions and related to similar forms found in many Hispanic-American countries. The famed tango singer Carlos Gardel was born in Toulouse, France, then raised in Buenos Aires, but as an adult he obtained legal papers saying he was born in Tacuarembó, probably to avoid French military authorities.

"La cumparsita" (little street procession, a grammatical diminutive of la comparsa) is a tango written in 1916 by the Uruguayan musician Gerardo Matos Rodríguez, It is among the most famous and recognizable tangos of all time.

The popular music of Uruguay, which focuses on rock, jazz, and many other forms, frequently makes reference to the distinctly Uruguayan sounds mentioned above. The group Los Shakers, similar to the Beatles, deserve a special mention as the band that kickstarted the Uruguayan rock scene.

Gaucho

The gaucho is a national symbol in Uruguay and Argentina but is also a strong culture in Paraguay and southern Brazil. Gauchos became greatly admired and renowned in legends, folklore and literature and became an important part of their regional cultural tradition.

Emigration

The rate of Uruguayan emigration to Europe is especially high in Spain, Portugal, Italy, France. In the Americas, emigration is mostly to the United States, Canada, Argentina, and other nearby Latin American countries such as Brazil and Chile. In Oceania, emigration is mainly to Australia, and to a lesser extent, New Zealand.

See also

 List of Uruguayans
 Demographics of Uruguay
 Uruguayan diaspora
 Hispanics
 Italic peoples
 Uruguayan Americans

References

Uruguayan people
Demographics of Uruguay
South American people by nationality
Ethnic groups in Uruguay